A Penrose drain is a soft, flexible rubber tube used as a surgical drain, to prevent the buildup of fluid in a surgical site. It belongs to the "passive" type of drain, the other broad type being "active". The Penrose drain is named after American gynecologist Charles Bingham Penrose (1862–1925).

Common uses
A Penrose drain removes fluid from a wound area. Frequently it is put in place by a surgeon after a procedure is complete to prevent the area from accumulating fluid, such as blood, which could serve as a medium for bacteria to grow in. In podiatry, a Penrose drain is often used as a tourniquet during a hallux nail avulsion procedure or ingrown toenail extraction. It can also be used to drain cerebrospinal fluid to treat a hydrocephalus patient.

See also
Instruments used in general surgery

References

Medical drains